The VEF I-12 was a tandem, two seats Latvian trainer aircraft designed by Kārlis Irbītis and produced by VEF in Riga.

Design and development

The single engine, tandem, two seat I-12 was a development of the similarly laid out I-11, strengthened for aerobatics. It was an all wood low wing monoplane, entirely plywood covered apart from the tail control surfaces and with a fixed, conventional undercarriage. Its cantilever wing was built around a main and an auxiliary box spar, both made from spruce and plywood. The short wing centre section was integral with the fuselage, with the main undercarriage legs on it.  These and the wheels, fitted with brakes, were faired.   Outboard, the wing panels tapered to rounded tips, carrying both the balanced and slotted differential ailerons and hand-operated camber-changing split flaps.

The fuselage was a rectangular box formed from spruce longerons, with a ply roof behind the cabin, where a long, multipart canopy enclosed the pilot and passenger's seats. The pilot sat at the rear; both had removable sections for access. In front of them the  Blackburn Cirrus four cylinder in-line, inverted engine was mounted on steel bearers, driving a wooden propeller.  At the rear of the fuselage the empennage was conventional, with the tailplane mounted on the fin above the fuselage line and braced from below with a steel strut on each side.  The elevators were hinged forward of the rudder, which carried a trim tab, but were shaped to allow its movement as it extended to the keel.

Operational history
The I-12 first flew on 26 June 1937, the first of twelve examples built. The first prototype, on a European tour begun in July 1937, made several demonstrations in Paris. In the UK it raced at Ramsgate, coming fifth in the handicapped Thanet Air Race at Ramsgate, as well as winning first prize for the best turned out aircraft. Late in August it came in second in the Cinque Ports Wakefield Cup races at Lympne. Its tour ended the following July, flown back to Riga by P. Avery in a record nine hours, non-stop from London. Avery flew another I-12 in 1939, coming fifth in the London to Isle of Man race and competing in the Isle of Man competition in May.

The I-12 was enthusiastically reviewed by the British aeronautical press and Rollasons were designated as distributors after the I-12 had been adjusted to meet UK certification requirements.  It was also offered for sale in the UK by D.R.P. Engines at £750 but no examples reached the UK civil register.

At least four were purchased as trainers by the Aizsargi in early 1938, most surviving to the Soviet occupation of 1940.

Operators

Aizsargi
Latvian Air Force

Specifications (I-12)

See also

References

1930s Latvian military trainer aircraft
Low-wing aircraft
Single-engined tractor aircraft
Aircraft first flown in 1937
VEF aircraft